Ciara Ferguson MLA (born  21 September 1971) is a Sinn Féin politician who is a Member of the Legislative Assembly from Foyle in Northern Ireland. Ferguson became the MLA for Foyle following a selection convention held by Sinn Féin after her predecessor Martina Anderson was forced to step down following an internal review by the party.

She attended Holy Cross College, Strabane. Prior to her election, Ferguson was a community development worker, based in Strabane.

References 

1971 births
Living people
Northern Ireland MLAs 2017–2022
21st-century politicians from Northern Ireland
Sinn Féin MLAs
Female members of the Northern Ireland Assembly
Northern Ireland MLAs 2022–2027